Caloptilia sapiivora is a moth of the family Gracillariidae. It is known from the islands of Honshū, Kyūshū and Shikoku in Japan.

The wingspan is 11.2-12.2 mm.

The larvae feed on Sapium japonicum. They mine the leaves of their host plant. In early instars the larva makes a tentiform blotch-mine on the lower side of the leaf. When the leaf tissue has been consumed within the mine, the larva leaves the mine and migrates towards the edge of the same leaf or another, which it cuts off from the edge towards the midrib. This cut off edge is rolled up to form a cone on the underside of the leaf. The larva continues to feed inside the cone until it is full-grown. The cocoon is formed inside the cone. It is whitish and spindle-shaped.

References

sapiivora
Moths of Japan